Charlie Ve'hetzi (a.k.a. - Charlie and a Half; Hebrew צ'ארלי וחצי) is a 1974 Israeli comedy. The movie was directed by Boaz Davidson and stars Israeli comedians Yehuda Barkan and Ze'ev Revach.

Plot 
Charlie gets by through fleecing suckers with a three-card Monte. He passes himself off as a rich businessman. Miko is a street kid who spends his time with Charlie instead of going to school. His sister tries to raise him on her own, unsuccessfully.
The plot follows Charlie's attempt to conquer the heart of Gila, a rich girl whose parents try to matchmake her to an American millionaire somewhat against her will.

Cast 
 Yehuda Barkan – Charlie Ben Chanania	
 Ze'ev Revach – Sasson	
 Arieh Elias – Zaki Ben Chanania	
  – Flora Ben Chanania	
 Haya Katzir – Gila Zohar	
 Geula Nuni – Lili	
 Elisheva Michaeli – Mrs. Zohar	
 Natan Cogan – Chaim Zohar	
 Tuvia Tzafir – Robert	
 Moshe Ish-Kassit – Gedalia	
 Reuven Shefer – Car Salesman	
 Tikva Aziz – Mazal	
 Aryeh Moskuna – Neighbor	
 Mordecai Ben-Ze'ev – Erlich	
 Nurit Cohen – Yafa
 David Shushan – Miko

See also 
Hagiga B'Snuker

External links 
 "Charlie Ve'hetzi" - The full film is available on VOD on the website for the Israel Film Archive - Jerusalem Cinematheque
 

1974 films
1970s Hebrew-language films
Films directed by Boaz Davidson
Israeli comedy films
1974 comedy films